David Gregory Kays (born May 10, 1962) is a United States district judge of the United States District Court for the Western District of Missouri.

Education and career

Born in Kansas City, Missouri, Kays received a Bachelor of Science degree from Southwest Missouri State University (now Missouri State University) in 1985 and a Juris Doctor from the University of Arkansas School of Law in 1987. He was in private practice in Missouri from 1988 to 1989. He was an assistant public defender in the Office of the Special Public Defender for Springfield, Missouri, in 1989. He worked in the Prosecuting Attorney's Office for Laclede County, Missouri, from 1988 to 1995, first as an assistant prosecuting attorney from 1988 to 1989, then as a chief assistant prosecuting attorney from 1989 to 1991, and finally as a prosecuting attorney from 1991 to 1995. He was an adjunct faculty member at Drury University from 1991 to 2004. He was an associate circuit judge for Laclede County from 1995 to 2004, and was a presiding judge for the Twenty-sixth Judicial Circuit of the State of Missouri from 2005 to 2008.

Federal judicial service

On November 15, 2007, Kays was nominated by President George W. Bush to a seat on the United States District Court for the Western District of Missouri vacated by Dean Whipple. Kays was confirmed by the United States Senate on June 10, 2008, and received his commission on June 19, 2008. He served as Chief Judge from January 3, 2014 to January 2, 2019.

Sources

1962 births
Living people
Judges of the United States District Court for the Western District of Missouri
Missouri state court judges
Missouri State University alumni
Lawyers from Kansas City, Missouri
Public defenders
United States district court judges appointed by George W. Bush
21st-century American judges
University of Arkansas alumni
Drury University faculty